Dundee Football Club, is an association football club based in Dundee, Scotland. The club was formed in 1893 from the amalgamation of two local clubs Our Boys FC and East End FC and played their first competitive match in August 1893 in a Scottish Division One fixture at West Craigie Park. By the end of their debut season, Dundee had moved to a new ground, Carolina Port, where they spent five seasons before moving to their current stadium Dens Park (also known as the Kilmac Stadium under a sponsorship) which has been their home for the past 112 years.

The club has won a total of five major trophies, including the League Championship once, the Scottish Cup once and the Scottish League Cup three times. Dundee have also won the second tier of Scottish football five times and the Scottish Challenge Cup twice (including the inaugural tournament). The club has played in Europe on four occasions in four separate competitions: the European Cup, the UEFA Cup, the Inter-Cities Fairs Cup and the UEFA Intertoto Cup. Dundee reached the semi-finals of both the European Cup, where they beaten by eventual winners A.C. Milan, and the Fairs Cup where they again lost out to the winners Leeds United.

This list details the club's achievements in major competitions and the top scorers for each season where available. Top scorers in bold were also the top scorers in Dundee's division that season. Records of competitions such as the Forfarshire Cup and the Penman Cup are not included due to them being considered of less importance than the Scottish Cup, League Cup and Challenge Cup.

Key

 P = Played
 W = Games won
 D = Games drawn
 L = Games lost
 F = Goals for
 A = Goals against
 Pts = Points
 Pos = Final position

 SD1/SDA = Scottish Division One/A
 SD2/SDB = Scottish Division Two/B
 SFD = Scottish First Division
 SPD = Scottish Premier Division
 SPL = Scottish Premier League
 SP = Scottish Premiership
 SC = Scottish Championship
 EC = European Cup
 IFC = Inter-Cities Fairs Cup
 UC = UEFA Cup
 UIC = UEFA Intertoto Cup

 PR = Preliminary Round
 QF = Quarter-finals
 R1 = Round 1
 R2 = Round 2
 R3 = Round 3
 R4 = Round 4
 R5 = Round 5
 R6 = Round 6
 SF = Semi-finals

Seasons

Footnotes
a.  The 1946–47 Scottish League Cup was the inaugural season of the competition.
b.  The 1990–91 Scottish Challenge Cup was the inaugural season of the competition.
c.  On 1 November 2010, Dundee went into administration as a result they were given a 25-point deduction as punishment.

References

Seasons
 
Dundee
Seasons